Structural steel is a category of steel used for making construction materials in a variety of shapes. Many structural steel shapes take the form of an elongated beam having a profile of a specific cross section. Structural steel shapes, sizes, chemical composition, mechanical properties such as strengths, storage practices, etc., are regulated by standards in most industrialized countries.

Most structural steel shapes, such as -beams, have high second moments of area, which means they are very stiff in respect to their cross-sectional area and thus can support a high load without excessive sagging.

Common structural shapes
The shapes available are described in many published standards worldwide, and a number of specialist and proprietary cross sections are also available.

-beam (-shaped cross-section – in Britain these include Universal Beams (UB) and Universal Columns (UC); in Europe it includes the IPE, HE, HL, HD and other sections; in the US it includes Wide Flange (WF or W-Shape) and  sections)
Z-Shape (half a flange in opposite directions)
HSS-Shape (Hollow structural section also known as SHS (structural hollow section) and including square, rectangular, circular (pipe) and elliptical cross sections)
Angle (-shaped cross-section)
Structural channel, or -beam, or  cross-section
Tee (-shaped cross-section)
Rail profile (asymmetrical -beam)
Railway rail
Vignoles rail
Flanged  rail
Grooved rail
Bar, a long piece with a rectangular cross section, but not so wide so as to be called a sheet.
Rod, a round or square section long compared to its width; see also rebar and dowel.
Plate, metal sheets thicker than 6 mm or  in.
Open web steel joist

While many sections are made by hot or cold rolling, others are made by welding together flat or bent plates (for example, the largest circular hollow sections are made from flat plate bent into a circle and seam-welded).

The terms angle iron, channel iron, and sheet iron have been in common use since before wrought iron was replaced by steel for commercial purposes. They have lived on after the era of commercial wrought iron and are still sometimes heard today, informally, in reference to steel angle stock, channel stock, and sheet, despite that they are misnomers (compare "tin foil", still sometimes used informally for aluminum foil). In formal writing for metalworking contexts, accurate terms like angle stock, channel stock, and sheet are used.

Standards

Standard structural steels (China)
GB standard steel structure refers to steel structures designed and manufactured according to Chinese national standards. The Chinese National Standards (GB standards) are a set of technical specifications and guidelines that ensure the quality and safety of products produced in China. The GB standard steel structure is commonly used in various types of buildings and structures such as industrial plants, warehouses, high-rise buildings, and bridges.

The GB standards for steel structures cover a wide range of topics, including design principles, construction requirements, testing methods, and quality control. Some of the main standards include:

GB/T 50017-2003 "Code for Design of Steel Structures": This standard provides guidelines for the design of steel structures, including structural analysis, load calculation, and design principles.

GB 50205-2001 "Code for Acceptance of Constructional Quality of Steel Structures": This standard specifies the quality requirements for steel structures during the construction and installation process.

GB/T 1591-2018 "High Strength Low Alloy Structural Steels": This standard specifies the requirements for high-strength low-alloy structural steel plates, bars, and shapes used in the construction of steel structures.

GB/T 3091-2015 "Welded Steel Pipes for Low Pressure Liquid Delivery": This standard specifies the requirements for welded steel pipes used in the construction of steel structures.

GB standard steel structures are widely used in China and are gaining popularity in other countries due to their high strength, durability, and cost-effectiveness.

Standard structural steels (Europe)
Most steels used throughout Europe are specified to comply with the European standard EN 10025. However, many national standards also remain in force.

Typical grades are described as 'S275J2' or 'S355K2W'. In these examples, 'S' denotes structural rather than engineering steel; 275 or 355 denotes the yield strength in newtons per square millimetre or the equivalent megapascals; J2 or K2 denotes the materials toughness by reference to Charpy impact test values; and the 'W' denotes weathering steel. Further letters can be used to designate fine grain steel ('N' or 'NL'); quenched and tempered steel ('Q' or 'QL'); and thermomechanically rolled steel ('M' or 'ML').

1. S275JOH Specification
S275JOH is steel grade in EN 10219 specification, EN 10210 standard. And the most widely used specification is EN10219 standard, which is Cold formed welded structural hollow sections of non-alloy and fine grain steels. 
EN10219-1 specifies the technical delivery conditions for cold formed welded structural hollow sections of circular, square or rectangular forms and applies to structural hollow sections formed cold without subsequent heat treatment.
Requirements for S275JOH pipe tolerances, dimensions and sectional s275 pipe properties are contained in EN 10219-2.
2. S275JOH Steel Pipes manufacture Process
The steel manufacturing process shall be at the discretion of the steel producer. S275JOH carbon steel pipes can be made in ERW, SAW or seamless process. All S275JOH steel material and S275JOH pipes should conform to EN10219 standards.

The normal yield strength grades available are 195, 235, 275, 355, 420, and 460, although some grades are more commonly used than others e.g. in the UK, almost all structural steel is grades S275 and S355. Higher grades are available in quenched and tempered material (500, 550, 620, 690, 890 and 960 – although grades above 690 receive little if any use in construction at present).

A set of Euronorms define the shape of a set of standard structural profiles:
 European I-beam: IPE – Euronorm 19-57
 European I-beam: IPN – DIN 1025-1
 European flange beams: HE – Euronorm 53-62
 European channels: UPN – DIN 1026-1
 European cold formed IS IS 800-1

Standard structural steels (US)
Steels used for building construction in the US use standard alloys identified and specified by ASTM International.  These steels have an alloy identification beginning with A and then two, three, or four numbers. The four-number AISI steel grades commonly used for mechanical engineering, machines, and vehicles are a completely different specification series.

The standard commonly used structural steels are:

Carbon steels
 A36 – structural shapes and plate.
 A53 – structural pipe and tubing.
 A500 – structural pipe and tubing.
 A501 – structural pipe and tubing.
 A529 – structural shapes and plate.
 A1085 – structural pipe and tubing.

High strength low alloy steels
 A441 – structural shapes and plates (Superseded by A572)
 A572 – structural shapes and plates.
 A618 – structural pipe and tubing.
 A992 – Possible applications are W or S I-Beams. 
 A913 – Quenched and Self Tempered (QST) W shapes.
 A270 – structural shapes and plates.

Corrosion resistant high strength low alloy steels
 A243 – structural shapes and plates.
 A588 – structural shapes and plates.

Quenched and tempered alloy steels
 A514 – structural shapes and plates.
 A517 – boilers and pressure vessels.
 Eglin steel – Inexpensive aerospace and weaponry items.

Forged steel
A668 – Steel Forgings

CE marking

The concept of CE marking for all construction products and steel products is introduced by the Construction Products Directive (CPD). The CPD is a European Directive that ensures the free movement of all construction products within the European Union.

Because steel components are "safety critical", CE Marking is not allowed unless the Factory Production Control (FPC) system under which they are produced has been assessed by a suitable certification body that has been approved to the European Commission.

In the case of steel products such as sections, bolts and fabricated steelwork the CE Marking demonstrates that the product complies with the relevant harmonized standard.

For steel structures the main harmonized standards are:
 Steel sections and plate – EN 10025-1
 Hollow sections – EN 10219-1 and EN 10210-1
 Pre-loadable bolts – EN 14399-1
 Non-preloadable bolts – EN 15048-1
 Fabricated steel – EN 1090 −1

The standard that covers CE Marking of structural steelwork is EN 1090-1. The standard has come into force in late 2010. After a transition period of two years, CE Marking will become mandatory in most European Countries sometime early in 2012. The official end date of the transition period is July 1, 2014.

Steel vs. concrete

Choosing the ideal structural material

Most construction projects require the use of hundreds of different materials. These range from the concrete of all different specifications, structural steel of different specifications, clay, mortar, ceramics, wood, etc. In terms of a load bearing structural frame, they will generally consist of structural steel, concrete, masonry, and/or wood, using a suitable combination of each to produce an efficient structure. Most commercial and industrial structures are primarily constructed using either structural steel or reinforced concrete. When designing a structure, an engineer must decide which, if not both, material is most suitable for the design. There are many factors considered when choosing a construction material. Cost is commonly the controlling element; however, other considerations such as weight, strength, constructability, availability, sustainability, and fire resistance will be taken into account before a final decision is made.

Cost – The cost of these construction materials will depend entirely on the geographical location of the project and the availability of the materials. Just as the price of gasoline fluctuates, so do the prices of cement, aggregate, steel, etc. Reinforced concrete derives about half of its construction costs from the required form-work. This refers to the lumber necessary to build the "box" or container in which the concrete is poured and held until it cures. The expense of the forms makes precast concrete a popular option for designers due to the reduced costs and time. Steel being sold by weight, the structural designer must specify the lightest members possible while  maintaining a safe structural design. Using many identical steel members rather than many unique ones also reduces cost.
Strength/weight ratio – Construction materials are commonly categorized by their strength to weight ratio—or specific strength, which is the strength of a material divided by its density. These ratios indicate how useful the material is for its weight, which in turn indicates its cost and ease of construction. Concrete is typically ten times stronger in compression than in tension, giving it a higher strength to weight ratio in compression.
Sustainability - Many construction companies and material vendors are becoming more environmentally friendly. Sustainability has become an entirely new consideration for materials that will be in the environment for generations. A sustainable material minimally affects the environment upon installation and throughout its life cycle. Reinforced concrete and structural steel can be sustainable if used properly. Over 80% of structural steel members are fabricated from recycled metals, called A992 steel. This member material is cheaper and has a higher strength to weight ratio than previously used steel members (A36 grade). Concrete's material components are naturally occurring materials that are not harmful to the environment, and concrete can now be poured to be permeable, letting water flow through a paved surface to reduce the need for drainage or runoff infrastructure. Concrete can also be crushed and used as aggregate in future concrete applications, avoiding the land fill.
Fire resistance - One of the most dangerous hazards to a building is a fire hazard. This is especially true in dry, windy climates and for structures constructed using wood. Special considerations must be taken into account with structural steel to ensure it is not under a dangerous fire hazard condition. Reinforced concrete characteristically does not pose a threat in the event of a fire and even resists the spreading of fire, as well as temperature changes. This makes concrete excellent insulation, improving the sustainability of the building it surrounds by reducing the required energy to maintain climate.
Corrosion – Some structural materials are susceptible to corrosion from such surrounding elements as water, heat, humidity, or salt.  Special precautions must be taken when installing a structural material to prevent it, and the occupants of the building must know of any accompanying maintenance requirements. For example, structural steel cannot be exposed to the environment because any moisture, or another contact with water, will cause it to rust, compromising the structural integrity of the building and endangering occupants and neighbors.

Reinforced concrete
Characteristics – Generally consisting of portland cement, water, construction aggregate (coarse and fine), and steel reinforcing bars (rebar), concrete is cheaper in comparison to structural steel. 
Strength – Concrete is a composite material with relatively high compressive strength properties, but lacking in tensile strength/ductility. This inherently makes concrete a useful material for carrying the weight of a structure. Concrete reinforced with steel rebar give the structure a stronger tensile capacity, as well as an increase in ductility and elasticity.
Constructability – Reinforced concrete must be poured and left to set, or harden. After setting (typically 1–2 days), a concrete must cure, the process in which concrete experiences a chemical reaction between the cementitious particles and the water. The curing process is complete after 28 days; however, construction may continue after 1–2 weeks, depending on the nature of the structure. Concrete can be constructed into nearly any shape and size. Approximately half of the cost of using reinforced concrete in a structural project is attributed to the construction of the form-work. In order to save time, and therefore costs, structural concrete members may be pre-cast. This refers to a reinforced concrete beam, girder, or column being poured off site and left to cure. After the curing process, the concrete member may be delivered to the construction site and installed as soon as it is needed. Since the concrete member was cured off location beforehand, construction may continue immediately after erection. 
Fire resistance – Concrete has excellent fire resistance properties, requiring no additional construction costs to adhere to the International Building Code (IBC) fire protection standards. However, concrete buildings will still likely use other materials that are not fire resistant. Therefore, a designer must still take into account the use of the concrete and where it will require fire hazardous materials in order to prevent future complications in the overall design.
Corrosion – Reinforced concrete, when constructed properly, has excellent corrosion resistance properties. Concrete is not only resistant to water, but needs it to cure and develop its strength over time. However, the steel reinforcement in the concrete must not be exposed in order to prevent its corrosion as this could significantly reduce the ultimate strength of the structure. The American Concrete Institute provides the necessary design specifications for an engineer to ensure there is enough concrete covering any steel reinforcement to prevent exposure to water. This cover distance must be specified because concrete will inevitable crack at locations carrying tension, or locations containing reinforcing bars for the purpose of carrying said tension. If the concrete cracks, it provides a path for water to travel directly to the reinforcing bars. Some reinforcing bars are coated in epoxy as a second order measure of preventing corrosion due to water contact. This method induces higher costs on the overall project, however, due to the higher cost of the epoxy coated bars. Also, when using epoxy coated bars, reinforced concrete members must be designed larger, as well as stronger, in order to balance the loss of friction between the reinforcing bars and concrete. This friction is referred to as bond strength, and it is vital to the structural integrity of a concrete member.

Structural steel
Characteristics – Structural steel differs from concrete in its attributed compressive strength as well as tensile strength. 
Strength – Having high strength, stiffness, toughness, and ductile properties, structural steel is one of the most commonly used materials in commercial and industrial building construction.  
Constructability - Structural steel can be developed into nearly any shape, which are either bolted or welded together in construction. Structural steel can be erected as soon as the materials are delivered on site, whereas concrete must be cured at least 1–2 weeks after pouring before construction can continue, making steel a schedule-friendly construction material. 
Fire resistance – Steel is inherently a noncombustible material. However, when heated to temperatures seen in a fire scenario, the strength and stiffness of the material is significantly reduced. The International Building Code requires steel be enveloped in sufficient fire-resistant materials, increasing overall cost of steel structure buildings.
Corrosion – Steel, when in contact with water, can corrode, creating a potentially dangerous structure. Measures must be taken in structural steel construction to prevent any lifetime corrosion. The steel can be painted, providing water resistance. Also, the fire resistance material used to envelope steel is commonly water resistant. 
Mold – Steel provides a less suitable surface environment for mold to grow than wood.

The tallest structures today (commonly called "skyscrapers" or high-rise) are constructed using structural steel due to its constructability, as well as its high strength-to-weight ratio.  In comparison, concrete, while being less dense than steel, has a much lower strength-to-weight ratio.  This is due to the much larger volume required for a structural concrete member to support the same load; steel, though denser, does not require as much material to carry a load.  However, this advantage becomes insignificant for low-rise buildings, or those with several stories or less. Low-rise buildings distribute much smaller loads than high-rise structures, making concrete the economical choice.  This is especially true for simple structures, such as parking garages, or any building that is a simple, rectilinear shape.

Structural steel and reinforced concrete are not always chosen solely because they are the most ideal material for the structure. Companies rely on the ability to turn a profit for any construction project, as do the designers. The price of raw materials (steel, cement, coarse aggregate, fine aggregate, lumber for form-work, etc.) is constantly changing. If a structure could be constructed using either material, the cheapest of the two will likely control. Another significant variable is the location of the project. The closest steel fabrication facility may be much further from the construction site than the nearest concrete supplier. The high cost of energy and transportation will control the selection of the material as well. All of these costs will be taken into consideration before the conceptual design of a construction project is begun.

Combining steel and reinforced concrete
Structures consisting of both materials utilize the benefits of structural steel and reinforced concrete. This is already common practice in reinforced concrete in that the steel reinforcement is used to provide steel's tensile strength capacity to a structural concrete member. A commonly seen example would be parking garages. Some parking garages are constructed using structural steel columns and reinforced concrete slabs. The concrete will be poured for the foundational footings, giving the parking garage a surface to be built on. The steel columns will be connected to the slab by bolting and/or welding them to steel studs extruding from the surface of the poured concrete slab. Pre-cast concrete beams may be delivered on site to be installed for the second floor, after which a concrete slab may be poured for the pavement area. This can be done for multiple stories. A parking garage of this type is just one possible example of many structures that may use both reinforced concrete and structural steel.

A structural engineer understands that there are an infinite number of designs that will produce an efficient, safe, and affordable building. It is the engineer's job to work alongside the owners, contractors, and all other parties involved to produce an ideal product that suits everyone's needs. When choosing the structural materials for their structure, the engineer has many variables to consider, such as the cost, strength/weight ratio, sustainability of the material, constructability, etc.

Thermal properties
The properties of steel vary widely, depending on its alloying elements.

Similarly, the melting point of steel changes based on the alloy.

Steel never turns into a liquid below this temperature. 'Steel' with more than 2.1% Carbon is no longer Steel, but is known as Cast iron.

Fire resistance

Steel loses strength when heated sufficiently. The critical temperature of a steel member is the temperature at which it cannot safely support its load. Building codes and structural engineering standard practice defines different critical temperatures depending on the structural element type, configuration, orientation, and loading characteristics. The critical temperature is often considered the temperature at which its yield stress has been reduced to 60% of the room temperature yield stress. In order to determine the fire resistance rating of a steel member, accepted calculations practice can be used, or a fire test can be performed, the critical temperature of which is set by the standard accepted to the Authority Having Jurisdiction, such as a building code. In Japan, this is below 400 °C. In China, Europe and North America (e.g., ASTM E-119), this is approximately 1000–1300 °F (530–810 °C). The time it takes for the steel element that is being tested to reach the temperature set by the test standard determines the duration of the fire-resistance rating.
Heat transfer to the steel can be slowed by the use of fireproofing materials, thus limiting steel temperature. Common fireproofing methods for structural steel include intumescent, endothermic, and plaster coatings as well as drywall, calcium silicate cladding, and mineral wool insulating blankets.

Concrete building structures often meet code required fire-resistance ratings, as the concrete thickness over the steel rebar provides sufficient fire resistance. However, concrete can be subject to spalling, particularly if it has an elevated moisture content. Although additional fireproofing is not often applied to concrete building structures, it is sometimes used in traffic tunnels and locations where a hydrocarbon fuel fire is more likely, as flammable liquid fires provides more heat to the structural element as compared to a fire involving ordinary combustibles during the same fire period. Structural steel fireproofing materials include intumescent, endothermic and plaster coatings as well as drywall, calcium silicate cladding, and mineral or high temperature insulation wool blankets. Attention is given to connections, as the thermal expansion of structural elements can compromise fire-resistance rated assemblies.

Manufacturing

Cutting workpieces to length is usually done with a bandsaw.

A beam drill line (drill line) has long been considered an indispensable way to drill holes and mill slots into beams, channels and HSS elements. CNC beam drill lines are typically equipped with feed conveyors and position sensors to move the element into position for drilling, plus probing capability to determine the precise location where the hole or slot is to be cut.

For cutting irregular openings or non-uniform ends on dimensional (non-plate) elements, a cutting torch is typically used. Oxy-fuel torches are the most common technology and range from simple hand-held torches to automated CNC coping machines that move the torch head around the structural element in accordance with cutting instructions programmed into the machine.

Fabricating flat plate is performed on a plate processing center where the plate is laid flat on a stationary 'table' and different cutting heads traverse the plate from a gantry-style arm or "bridge". The cutting heads can include a punch, drill or torch.

See also

 Diamond plate
 Dowel
 Flame cleaning
 Flange
 Gusset plate
 Hollow structural section
 I-beam
 I-joist
 Light steel structure
 Open web steel joist
 Railway rail
 Steel design
 Structural channel
 Structural engineering
 Structural shape rolling
 T-beam

References

External links

Guide to the CE Marking of Structural Steelwork, BCSA Publication No. 46/08.
Encyclopedia for steel construction information 
Structural Steel Handbook

 
Structural engineering
Steels